The War of 1812 bibliography is a selective, annotated bibliography using APA style citations of the many books related to the War of 1812. There are thousands of books and articles written about this topic. Only the most useful are presented.

Overviews
 
 is a close reading of Adams's history.
  short overview  
 
 
 
 
  by English military historian
 , popular
 
  most comprehensive guide; 500 entries by 70 scholars from several countries
 
  standard scholarly history
 
 Hitsman, J. M. The Incredible War of 1812 (1965), survey by Canadian scholar
 Langguth, A. J. Union 1812: The Americans Who Fought the Second War of Independence (2006) 495pp, popular history
 Latimer, Jon, 1812: War with America (Harvard, 2007). A scholarly British perspective 
 Mahon, John K. War of 1812 (University of Florida Press 1972). Overall military history.
 Malcomson, Robert. Historical Dictionary of the War of 1812 (Landham, Md.: Scarecrow Press, 2006). , 699pp
 Misiak, Zig, "War of 1812: Highlighting Native Nations", 2012,  website
 Smith, Gene Allen. The Slaves' Gamble: Choosing Sides in the War of 1812 (Palgrave Macmillan, 2013).
 Stagg, J.C.A. The War of 1812: Conflict for a Continent  (Cambridge Essential Histories, 2012) 
 Suthren, Victor. The War of 1812 (1999). 
 Sweeny, Alastair. Fire Along the Frontier: Great Battles of the War of 1812 (Dundurn, 2012). ; Resource Site; popular history by Canadian journalist
 Taylor, Alan. The Civil War of 1812: American Citizens, British Subjects, Irish Rebels, & Indian Allies (2010) by Pulitzer Prize winner
 Tucker, Spencer C., ed. The Encyclopedia of the War of 1812 (3 vol: ABC-CLIO, 2012), 1034pp
 Zuehlke, Mark. For Honour's Sake: The War of 1812 and the Brokering of an Uneasy Peace. (2007) by Canadian military historian

Historiography

Journal
 Journal of the War of 1812 complete text

Causes and diplomacy
 Brown, Roger H. The Republic in Peril: 1812 (1964), on American politics 
 Burt, Alfred L. The United States, Great Britain, and British North America from the Revolution to the Establishment of Peace after the War of 1812. (1940), detailed history by Canadian scholar; online
 Carr, Albert Z., The Coming of War: An Account of the Remarkable Events Leading to the War of 1812, (Doubleday, 1960) 
 
 Hickey, Donald R. "The War of 1812" in Julian E. Zelizer, ed. The American Congress (2004), pp 93–111
 Horsman, Reginald. The Causes of the War of 1812. (1962).  online version
 
 
 Perkins, Bradford. Prologue to War: England and the United States, 1805-1812. 1961.
 Perkins, Bradford. Castlereagh and Adams: England and the United States, 1812·1823 (1964) excerpt; online review
 Pratt, Julius W. Expansionists of 1812. (1925)
 
 
 Rutland, Robert A.  The Presidency of James Madison (1990)
 Smelser, Marshall. The Democratic Republic 1801-1815 (1968). general survey of American politics and diplomacy 
 Stagg, John C. A.  Mr. Madison's War: Politics, Diplomacy, and Warfare in the Early American republic, 1783-1830. (1983).
  
  
 Taylor, George Rogers, ed. The War of 1812: Past Justifications and Present Interpretations (1963), selections from historians and primary sources

Treaty of Ghent and aftermath
 Burt, A. L. The United States, Great Britain and British North America from the Revolution to the Establishment of Peace after the War of 1812. (1940) online edition
 Engelman, Fred L. The Peace of Christmas Eve (1962), popular account 
 Hickey, Donald R. The War of 1812: A Forgotten Conflict (1990) pp 281–98.
 Perkins, Bradford.  Castlereagh and Adams: England and the United States, 1812-1823. (1964), the standard scholarly history 
 Remini, Robert Vincent, Henry Clay: Statesman for the Union (1991) pp 94–122

Social and cultural studies
 Eustace, Nicole. 1812: War and the Passions of Patriotism (University of Pennsylvania Press; 2012) 315 pages; examines speeches, tavern songs, political cartoons, etc. in a cultural history of the war and its appeal to the American imagination.
 Graves, Dianne. In the Midst of Alarms: The Untold Story of Women and the War of 1812 (Robin Brass Studio 2012).
 Smith, Gene Allen. The Slaves' Gamble: Choosing Sides in the War of 1812 (Palgrave Macmillan, 2013).

Military operations
 Center for Military History. U.S. Army Campaigns of the War of 1812: Online free
 Barbuto, Richard V. The Canadian Theater 1813. (2013) 
 Barbuto, Richard V. The Canadian Theater 1814. (2014) 
 Blackmon, Richard D. The Creek War 1813-1814; 43pp  
 Maass, John R. Defending A New Nation 1783-1811 (2013) 59pp  
 Neimeyer, Charles P. The Chesapeake Campaign, 1813–1814 (2014) 
 Rauch, Steven J. The Campaign of 1812 (2013); 58pp 
 Stoltz III, Joseph F. The Gulf Theater, 1813-1815
 
 Elting, John R. Amateurs, To Arms! A Military History of the War of 1812. 1991.  (hardcover);  (1995 Da Capo Press paperback).
 Hickey, Donald. The War of 1812: A Forgotten Conflict. 1989. 
 Latimer, Jon, 1812: War with America, Cambridge, MA: Harvard, 2007.
 Quimby, Robert S., The US Army in the War of 1812: an operational and command study (1997) online version

Canada-US border
  online version 
 Ellis, James H.  A Ruinous and Unhappy War: New England and the War of 1812 (New York: Algora Publishing, 2009)
 Everest, Allan S. The War of 1812 in the Champlain Valley. Syracuse, N.Y.: Syracuse Univ. Press, 1981. 
 Herkalo, Kieth A. The Battles at Plattsburgh: September 11, 1814, The History Press, Charleston, 2012
 Stanley, George F.G. The War of 1812: Land Operations (1983) Macmillan of Canada.  Canadian perspective
 
 
 Smith, Joshua M. Borderland Smuggling: Patriots, Loyalists, and Illicit Trade in the Northeast, 1783-1820" (Gainesville: University Press of Florida, 2006)
 
 Young, Bennett H. The Battle of the Thames (Louisville, 1903). online from Google
 Zaslow. M. ed. The Defended Border: Upper Canada and the War of 1812 (1964) scholarly essays

Gulf and New Orleans
 
 Owsley, Frank. Struggle for the Gulf borderlands: the Creek War and the battle of New Orleans 1812-1815 (1981)
 Pickles, Tim New Orleans 1815; Osprey Campaign Series, #28. Osprey Publishing, 1993.
 
 Remini, Robert V. The Battle of New Orleans: Andrew Jackson and America's First Military Victory. Viking Penguin, 1999. 
 Rowland, Mrs. Dunbar; Andrew Jackson's Campaign against the British, or, the Mississippi Territory in the War of 1812, concerning the Military Operations of the Americans, Creek Indians, British, and Spanish, 1813-1815 (1926), online version

Soldiers, sailors and generals
  
 Cleaves, Freeman. Old Tippecanoe: William Henry Harrison and His Time (1990)
 Crawford, Michael J., "U.S. Navy Petty Officers in the Era of the War of 1812," Journal of Military History, 76 (Oct. 2012), 1035–51.
 Cress, Lawrence. Citizens in arms: The army and the militia in American society to the War of 1812 (1982)
 Elliott, Charles Winslow.  Winfield Scott: The Soldier and the Man. 1937. online version
 
 Grodzinski, John R. Defender of Canada: Sir George Prevost and the War of 1812(University of Oklahoma Press; 2013) 360 pages; 
 Hitsman, J. M. "Sir George Prevost's conduct of the Canadian War of 1812," Canadian Historical Association Report, 1962: 34–43.
 Johnson, Timothy D. Winfield Scott: The Quest for Military Glory (1998) 
 Lamb, W. K. The hero of Upper Canada (Toronto, 1962), on Isaac Brock
 Url
McCavitt, John, and Christopher T. George. The Man Who Captured Washington: Major General Robert Ross and the War of 1812. (2016). see online review
 Meyer, Leland Winfield. The Life and Times of Colonel Richard M. Johnson (1932)
 Olinger, Mark A., "Organizing for War in Canada, 1812–1814: The U.S. Army Experience," Ontario History 104 (Spring 2012), 21–44.
 Remini, Robert V. Andrew Jackson and the Course of American Empire, 1767-1821 (1977)
 
 Skeen, C. Edward. John Armstrong, Jr., 1758-1843 (1981)
 Skelton, William. "High army leadership in the era of the War of 1812: the making and remaking of the officer corps," William and Mary Quarterly 51 (1994) in JSTOR
  
 Stagg, J. C. A., "United States Army Officers in the War of 1812: A Statistical and Behavioral Portrait," Journal of Military History, 76 (Oct. 2012), 1001–34.
 Stagg, J.C.A. "Enlisted men in the United States Army 1812-1815," William and Mary Quarterly 43 (1986) in JSTOR
 Stagg, J.C.A. "Soldiers in peace and war: comparative perspectives on the recruitment of the United States Army, 1802–1815," William and Mary Quarterly 57 (2000) in JSTOR
 Url
 Turner, Wesley B. British Generals in the War of 1812 (2nd ed. 2011) on Sir George Prevost, Isaac Brock, Roger Sheaffe, Baron Francis de Rottenburg, and Gordon Drummond

Primary sources
 
 Tupper, F. B. The Life and Correspondence of Major-General Sir Isaac Brock, K. B., 2nd ed. (London, 1847),
 Indexed eLibrary of War of 1812 Resources at Fire Along the Frontier Resource Site

Naval

Secondary sources
 Arthur, Brian How Britain Won the War of 1812: The Royal Navy's Blockades of the United States, 1812-1815 (Boydell Press, 2011) 
 Beirne, Francis F. The War of 1812. New York: Dutton, 1949. 410 pp. (Reprinted 1965 by Shoestring).
 Berube, Claude G. and Rodgaard, John R., A Call to the Sea: Captain Charles Stewart of the USS Constitution. (2005)
 Bird, Harrison. Navies in the Mountains: The Battles on the Waters of Lake Champlain and Lake George, 1609-1814. New York: Oxford Univ. Press, 1962. 
 Budiansky, Stephen. Perilous Fight: America's Intrepid War with Britain on the High Seas, 1812-1815 (New York: Vintage, 2012) 448pp; 
 Byron, Gilbert. The War of 1812 on the Chesapeake Bay. Baltimore: Maryland Historical Society, 1964. 
 Collins, Mark, et al.  The War of 1812 and the Rise of the U.S. Navy (2012) excerpt and text search
 Cranwell, John P., and William B. Crane. Men of Marque: A History of Private Armed Vessels Out of Baltimore During the War of 1812. New York: Norton, 1940. 
 Cruikshank, E.A. "The Contest for the Command of Lake Ontario in 1814," Ontario Historical Society Papers and Records, XXI (1924).
 Daughan, George C. 1812: The Navy's War (Basic Books; 2011) 491 pages; U.S. Navy
 Dudley, Wade G. Splintering the Wooden Wall: The British Blockade of the United States, 1812-1815 Annapolis: Naval Institute Press, 2003.
 Dudley, William S. "Commodore Isaac Chauncey and U.S. Joint Operations on Lake Ontario, 1813-14." In New Interpretations in Naval History: Selected Papers From the Eighth Naval History Symposium, edited by William B. Cogar, 139-155. Annapolis: Naval Institute Press, 1989.
 Dudley, William S. "Naval Historians and the War of 1812." Naval History 4 (Spring 1990): 52-57; historiography
 Eckert, Edward K. The Navy Department in the War of 1812. Univ. of Florida Social Sciences Monograph, No. 48. Gainesville: Univ. of Florida Press, 1973. 
 Eller, Ernest M., William J. Morgan, and Richard M. Basoco. Sea Power and the Battle of New Orleans. New Orleans: Landmark Society, 1965. 
 Everest, Allan S. The War of 1812 in the Champlain Valley. Syracuse, N.Y.: Syracuse Univ. Press, 1981. 
 Forester, Cecil S. The Age of Fighting Sail: The Story of the Naval War of 1812. Garden City, N.Y.: Doubleday, 1956. 
 Garitee, Jerome R. The Republic's Private Navy: The American Privateering Business as Practiced by Baltimore During the War of 1812. The American Maritime Library, Vol. 8. Middletown, Conn.: Published for Mystic Seaport by Wesleyan Univ. Press, 1977. 
 Hickey, Donald R. The War of 1812: A Forgotten Conflict. Urbana: Univ. of Illinois Press, 1989. 
 Hitsman, J. Mackay. The Incredible War of 1812: A Military History. Toronto: Univ. of Toronto Press, 1965. 
 Lambert, Andrew The Challenge: Britain Against America in the Naval War of 1812  (Faber and Faber, 2012) 
 Lossing, Benson J. Pictorial Field-Book of the War of 1812. New York: Harper, 1868. 1084 pp.
 Mahan, Alfred T. * [https://archive.org/details/seapowerwar181201mahauoft Sea Power in Its Relation to the War of 1812 (2 vols.) (1905) (Boston: Little Brown) American Library Association. (Reprinted 1968 by Greenwood; 1970 by Haskell). 
 Mahon, John K. The War of 1812. Gainesville: Univ. of Florida Press, 1972. 
 Maloney, Linda M. "The War of 1812: What Role for Sea Power?" In In Peace and War: Interpretations of American Naval History, 1775-1984, 2d ed., edited by Kenneth J. Hagan, 46-62. Westport, Conn.: Greenwood, 1984. 
 McCranie, Kevin D. Utmost Gallantry: The U.S. and Royal Navies at Sea in the War of 1812  (Naval Institute Press, 2011) 
 Muller, Charles G. The Darkest Day: 1814; The Washington- Baltimore Campaign. Philadelphia: Lippincott, 1963. 
 Poolman, Kenneth. Guns Off Cape Ann: The Story of the Shannon and the Chesapeake. Chicago: Rand McNally, 1962. 
 Pullen, Hugh F. The Shannon and the Chesapeake. Toronto: McClelland & Stewart, 1970. 
 Roosevelt, Theodore; The Naval War of 1812; G.P. Putnam's Sons; New York, New York; 1882; numerous reprints eText Version at Project Gutenberg.
 Shomette, Donald G. Flotilla: Battle for the Patuxent. Solomons, Md.: Calvert Marine Museum Press, 1981. 
 
 Skaggs, David Curtis. "Joint Operations During the Detroit- Lake Erie Campaign, 1813." In New Interpretations in Naval History: Selected Papers From the Eighth Naval History Symposium, edited by William B. Cogar, 121-138. Annapolis: Naval Institute Press, 1989. 
 
 
  online version
 Stacey, C.P.  "The Ships of the British Squadron on Lake Ontario, 1812-14," Canadian Historical Review, XXXIV (December, 1953).
 Toll, Ian, Six Frigates: The Epic History of the Founding of the US Navy, New York: W. W. Norton (2006)

Primary sources
 Dudley, William S., and Michael J. Crawford, eds. The Naval War of 1812: A Documentary History Washington: Naval Historical Center: GPO, 1985-. Vol. 1, 1812; Vol. 2, 1813; Vol. 3, 1814-1815. Contains contemporary records from letters, journals, ships' logs, and newspapers from American as well as foreign archives and libraries. The volumes are well illustrated and offer useful bibliographies and extensive indexes.
 Jones, Noah. Journals of Two Cruises Aboard the American Privateer Yankee, by a Wanderer. New York: Macmillan, 1967. 
 .
 Porter, David. Journal of a Cruise Made to the Pacific Ocean, by Captain David Porter, in the United States Frigate Essex, in the Years 1812, 1813, and 1814. New York: Wiley & Halstead, 1815. 2 vols. (Reprinted 1970 by Gregg).

Indians
 Allen, Robert S. "His Majesty's Indian Allies: Native Peoples, the British Crown, and the War of 1812" in The Michigan Historical Review, 14:2 (Fall 1988), pp 1–24.
 Antal, Sandy. A Wampum Denied: Procter's War of 1812 (2nd ed. 2011) examines Henry Procter & the Canadian/British/Native perspectives
 Benn, Carl. The Iroquois in the War of 1812. Toronto: University of Toronto Press, 1998.  
 Calloway, C. Crown and Calumet: British-Indian relations, 1783-1815 (1987)
 Cruikshank, E. A. "The 'Chesapeake' crisis as it affected Upper Canada," Ontario History, 24 (1927): 281–322; 
 Cruikshank, E. A. "The employment of Indians in the War of 1812," American Historical Association, Annual report 1895: 319–35
 , argues the Prophet was more important than Tecumseh
  
 
   online version
 Misiak, Zig, "War of 1812: Highlighting Native Nations",2012,  
 Owsley, Frank. Struggle for the Gulf borderlands: the Creek War and the battle of New Orleans 1812-1815 (1981)
 
 Stanley, George F. G.  "The Indians in the War of 1812," Canadian Historical Review, 31 (June, 1950)
 Sugden, John. Tecumseh: A Life. New York: Holt, 1997. , the standard scholarly biography

Canada

 Barbuto, Richard V. The Canadian Theater, 1813. Washington, D.C.: United States Army Center of Military History, 2013. 
 Berton, Pierre. The Invasion of Canada. Toronto: McClelland and Stewart, 1980. .; Flames Across the Border. Toronto: McClelland and Stewart, 1981. . Popular military history from Canadian perspective
 Carter-Edwards, Dennis. "The War of 1812 Along the Detroit Frontier: A Canadian Perspective", in The Michigan Historical Review, 13:2 (Fall 1987), pp. 25–50.
 Horsman, Reginald.  "On to Canada: Manifest Destiny and United States Strategy in the War of 1812" in The Michigan Historical Review, 13:2 (Fall 1987), pp. 1–24.
 Collins, G. Guidebook to the historic sites of the War of 1812 (1998)
 Stagg, J., 'Between Black Rock and a hard place: Peter B. Porter's plan for an American invasion of Canada in 1812,' Journal of the Early Republic 19 (1999) in JSTOR
  online version

Primary sources
 
 Cruikshank, Ernest A., ed. Documents relating to the invasion of Canada and the surrender of Detroit, 1812 (1912) reprinted 1971
 Dudley, W., (ed.) The Naval War of 1812: a Documentary History, 4 vols (1985-)
 Gellner, J. (ed), Recollections of the War of 1812: Three Eyewitnesses' Accounts (1964)
 Graves, D. (ed), Merry hearts make light days: the War of 1812 journal of Lieutenant John Le Couteur, 104th Foot (1993)
 Graves, D. (ed), Soldiers of 1814: American Enlisted Men's Memoirs of the Niagara Campaign (1996)    
 Hickey, Donald R., ed. The War of 1812: Writings from America's Second War of Independence (New York: Library of America, 2013). xxx, 892 pp.                         
 Klinck, C. & Talman, J. (eds), The Journal of Major John Norton, 1816 (1970)
 Wood, W. (ed), Select British Documents of the Canadian War of 1812, 4 vols (1920–28)

External sources
 Six Nations along the Grand River Territory
 President Madison's 1812 War Message, with lesson plans and numerous primary documents from US and Britain regarding the causes of the war
 Dictionary of Canadian Biography, long scholarly articles on all the major figures
 The Naval History & Heritage Command's War of 1812 Website 
 Bibliography of the United States Army during the War of 1812 compiled by the United States Army Center of Military History
 War of 1812 in the Buffalo/Niagara Area: Over 80 books and manuscripts focus on this important region, compiled by the Buffalo History Museum, which has an extensive War of 1812 collection

1812